Lǐ (理) is a Chinese surname. In Mandarin it is pronounced with the dipped third tone of the four tones.

Origin
Li (理) family name originated from Gaoyao (皐陶) the son of Shaohao (少昊) during the reign of emperor Shun. Gaoyao was father of Boyi (伯益) the origin of the surname Yíng (嬴), and ancestor of Gaoyang (高揚).

During ancient times Gaoyang's posterity took the surname Li (理), later many changed to surnames Li (里), Li (李), etc.

See also
Li Surname (里)
Li (surname)

References

Surnames
Chinese-language surnames
Individual Chinese surnames